Halina Czerny-Stefańska ([ˈxaˈlina t͡ʂɛrnɨ stɛˈfaj᷉ska] 31 December 19221 July 2001) was a Polish pianist.

Life
She studied piano under her father, Stanisław Szwarcenberg-Czerny, as well as with Alfred Cortot at the École Normale de Musique in Paris, and later with Józef Turczyński and Zbigniew Drzewiecki in Warsaw.  She was a joint First Prize winner at the IV International Chopin Piano Competition in Warsaw in 1949, sharing this prize with Bella Davidovich.  Her repertoire was restricted to few composers other than Frédéric Chopin and even her Chopin repertoire was not large.  For example, she did not play the Piano Concerto No. 1 in E minor live until 1951, and she never played the F minor concerto at all, as she did not like it.

She was proven to be the real pianist in a recording of the E minor concerto that was misattributed to Dinu Lipatti. The recording was released in 1966 by EMI, and on the 1971 British release was a note to the effect that, although the name of the conductor and orchestra were not known, there was no doubt the soloist was Lipatti. The BBC broadcast the recording in 1981, and a listener wrote in, noting the similarities between it and a Supraphon recording from the early 1950s with Czerny-Stefańska under Václav Smetáček. Tests revealed these were one and the same recording. The so-called Lipatti recording was withdrawn.

Halina Czerny-Stefańska was a juror in many piano competitions including the Leeds International Pianoforte Competition, the International Tchaikovsky Competition, and the Marguerite Long-Jacques Thibaud Competition.  She was also a juror at the International Chopin Piano Competition for many years.

Her daughter, with husband Ludwik Stefański (1917–1982) is Elżbieta Stefańska-Łukowicz (b. 1943), is a harpsichordist and professor at the Academy of Music in Kraków, Poland.

Halina Czerny-Stefańska died in Kraków on 1 July 2001.

Selected recordings 
Halina Czerny-Stefańska's discography includes recordings done by the labels: Deutsche Grammophon, Decca, Emi Classics, His Master's Voice, Polskie Nagrania "Muza", Supraphon, Selene, Pony Cayon, RCA Records, RCA-Japan and Telefunken.

She has recorded works by Mozart, Beethoven, Chopin (a large selection), Paderewski, Grieg, Szymanowski, and Zarębski.

Frédéric Chopin, Piano Concerto in E minor Op. 11, Supraphon SUA 10130 (1955).
Frédéric Chopin, 24 preludes Op. 28, Ace of Diamonds SDD 2146 (Telefunken).
Ludwig van Beethoven, Piano Concerto No. 2 in B-Flat Major Op. 19; Edvard Grieg, Piano Concerto in A Minor  Op. 16. Polish Radio Symphony Orchestra, Jan Krenz, Conductor. Musical Heritage Society (MHS 1101, undated).
Frédéric Chopin, Complete set of the Polonaises, Polskie Nagrania.
Frédéric Chopin, Complete set of the Nocturnes, Japanese RCA (1985–87).
Frédéric Chopin, Complete set of the Mazurkas, Canyon Classics (1989–90).
Wolfgang Amadeus Mozart, Piano Concerto No. 23 in A major, K. 488. Česká filharmonie (Czech Philharmonic), Karel Ančerl, Conductor. Supraphon (1952).

References

External links
 Halina Czerny-Stefańska  at The Fryderyk Chopin Institute in Warsaw. 
 Halina Czerny-Stefańska at the Naxos.com

Polish classical pianists
Polish women pianists
Burials at Rakowicki Cemetery
1922 births
2001 deaths
École Normale de Musique de Paris alumni
Alumni of the Academy of Music in Kraków
Polish music educators
International Chopin Piano Competition winners
20th-century classical pianists
Commanders of the Order of Polonia Restituta
Women classical pianists
Recipients of the State Award Badge (Poland)
Musicians from Kraków
People from Kraków Voivodeship (1919–1939)
20th-century women pianists